Country Concert is a c. 1617 oil on canvas painting by Guercino, now in the Uffizi Gallery in Florence. It is considered a rare instance of pure pastoral landscape in his oeuvre.

References

1617 paintings
Landscape paintings
Paintings by Guercino
Paintings in the collection of the Uffizi